La Neuville-d'Aumont is a former commune in the Oise department in northern France. On 1 January 2017, it was merged into the new commune La Drenne.

See also
 Communes of the Oise department

References

Former communes of Oise
Populated places disestablished in 2017